Sir Matthew Lamb, 1st Baronet (1705 – 6 November 1768) was a British barrister and politician. He was the grandfather of Prime Minister William Lamb, 2nd Viscount Melbourne.

Lamb was the son of Matthew Lamb, of Southwell, Nottinghamshire, and nephew of Peniston Lamb. His brother was Robert Lamb, bishop of Peterborough. He sat as member of parliament for Stockbridge between 1741 and 1747 and for Peterborough between 1747 and 1768. In 1755 he was created a Baronet, of Brocket Hall in Hertfordshire.

He married with Charlotte, daughter and heiress of Thomas Coke who succeeded to Melbourne Hall in Derbyshire. He died in November 1768 and was succeeded in the baronetcy by his son Peniston, who was raised to the peerage as Viscount Melbourne in 1770. His daughter Charlotte married Henry Belasyse, 2nd Earl Fauconberg.

References

Kidd, Charles, Williamson, David (editors). Debrett's Peerage and Baronetage (1990 edition). New York: St Martin's Press, 1990, 

1705 births
1768 deaths
Baronets in the Baronetage of Great Britain
British MPs 1741–1747
British MPs 1747–1754
British MPs 1754–1761
British MPs 1761–1768
Members of the Parliament of Great Britain for English constituencies
English barristers